Dwarakeswar River (also known as Dhalkisor) is a major river in the western part of the Indian state of West Bengal.

Course
The river originates near Madhabpur in Purulia district and enters Bankura district near Chhatna. It cuts across the district flowing past the district headquarters and enters the southeastern tip of East Bardhaman District. It then passes through Hooghly District.

See also

List of rivers of India

References

Rivers of West Bengal
Rivers of India